Geraldine Edith Mitton (14 October 186825 March 1955), pen name G. E. Mitton, was an English novelist, biographer, editor, and guide-book writer. Born in Bishop Auckland, County Durham, she was the third daughter of Rev. Henry Arthur Mitton, a master of Sherburn Hospital. In 1896, she moved to London, where she worked with Walter Besant on his survey of London. In 1899 she joined the staff of the publishing company A & C Black, where she was on the editorial staff of Who's Who. She married colonial administrator Sir George Scott in 1920, becoming his third wife. She collaborated with Scott on several novels set in Burma, and wrote his biography, Scott of the Shan Hills, which was published in 1936, the year after his death.

Works
1902 The Opportunist
1902 Chelsea: The Fascination of London
1905 The Scenery of London, illustrated by Herbert M. Marshall
1907 The Children's Book of Stars
1907 A Bachelor Girl in Burma
1909 The Book of the Railway, illustrated by Allan Stewart
1910 The Thames, illustrated by E. W. Haslehust
1911 Where Great Men Lived in London
1911 The Isle of Wight
1915 Cornwall
1915  Austria-Hungary
1916 " The Lost Cities of Ceylon", published John Murray, London.  Reprint 1928.
1936 Scott of the Shan Hills

Jointly with J. G. Scott:
1913 In the Grip of the Wild Wa
1922 The Green Moth
1923 A Frontier Man
1924 Under an Eastern Sky

References

External links

 
 
 

1868 births
1955 deaths
English biographers
English women novelists
Spouses of British politicians
English women non-fiction writers
Women biographers